The Queen Anne’s Railroad was a railroad that ran between Love Point, Maryland, and Lewes, Delaware, with connections to Baltimore via ferry across the Chesapeake Bay.  The Queen Anne's Railroad company was formed in Maryland in 1894, and received legislative authorization from Delaware in February 1895.  The railroad's original western terminus was in Queenstown, Maryland, and was moved via a  extension to Love Point in 1902, which shortened the ferry trip to Baltimore.

The Queen Anne's Railroad Company began operating a summer-only Cape May Express between Queenstown and Lewes in 1901 with a connecting steamer across the Delaware Bay to Cape May, New Jersey. The company owned and operated the Queen Anne's Ferry & Equipment Company which consisted of the steamers Endeavor, Queen Anne and Queen Caroline.

Towns served
The following towns were served by the Queen Anne's Railroad:

Centreville, Maryland (via the Centreville Branch)
Chester, Maryland
Denton, Maryland
Hickman, Delaware
Love Point, Maryland
Queen Anne, Maryland
Queenstown, Maryland
Stevensville, Maryland
Adamsville, Delaware
Blanchard, Delaware
Ellendale, Delaware
Georgetown, Delaware
Greenwood, Delaware
Lewes, Delaware
Milton, Delaware
Owens, Delaware
Rehoboth Beach, Delaware

An article appearing in the April 9, 1897 issue of The Morning News announcing the opening of the new railway lists the stations, in order, as Queenstown, Bloomingdale, Wye Mills, Willoughby, Queen Anne, Hillsboro, Downes, Tuckahoe, Denton, Hobbs, Hickman, Adamsville, Blanchard, and Greenwood where the line terminated while construction continued to Ellendale.

During first half of the 20th Century

Through a complex series of acquisitions in 1905, Queen Anne's Railroad ceased to exist and its assets became the property of the Maryland, Delaware and Virginia Railway Company (MD&V), a subsidiary of the Pennsylvania Railroad. Into the 1920s the railroad operated trains from Love Point on the eastern Chesapeake shore town of Love Point, east to Queenstown, Maryland, to Greenwood, Delaware and then to Lewes, Delaware.

Both the Maryland, Delaware and Virginia Railway Company and the nearby Baltimore, Chesapeake and Atlantic Railway were merged into the Baltimore & Eastern Railroad in 1928. Already by 1932 the company substituted with bus service replacing train service along the original route of the railway from Queenstown on the Chesapeake shore of eastern Maryland to Greenwood, and then to Lewes. This bus was gone from the schedule by 1941, as the company dropped its passenger operations.

Current status
Much of the railroad's original track has been abandoned, but segments are still used for freight rail service by the Delmarva Central Railroad.  In Queen Anne's County, Maryland, a project has converted much of the railroad right-of-way into part of the Cross Island Trail, a rail trail which is, in turn, part of the American Discovery Trail.  The path of the railroad is approximated today by the following roads:
Maryland Route 18
U.S. Route 50
Maryland Route 404
Maryland Route 16
Delaware Route 16
Delaware Route 1
U.S. Route 9

A Delaware state historical marker in Milton and another in Ellendale's historic Railroad Square district commemorate the railroad. The original railroad stations in Stevensville and Sudlersville are both still in existence and serve as museums.

References

External links
Queen Anne's Railroad Society (QARRS)

Defunct Maryland railroads
Defunct Delaware railroads
Predecessors of the Pennsylvania Railroad
Queen Anne's County, Maryland
Talbot County, Maryland
Caroline County, Maryland
Transportation in Sussex County, Delaware
Railway companies established in 1894
Railway companies disestablished in 1905
1894 establishments in Maryland
1895 establishments in Delaware
1905 disestablishments in Maryland
1905 disestablishments in Delaware